HOTGOLD TV

is a Portuguese pornography premium cable and satellite television network owned by HOT Gold. Its flagship programming are Portuguese pornographic films.

Portuguese-language television stations
Television channels and stations established in 2009
Television stations in Portugal